The short-tailed snake (Lampropeltis extenuata) is a small harmless colubrid snake. Fossorial and seldom seen, it is found only in sandy, upland parts of Florida where it is listed as Threatened and is protected by state law.

Etymology

The short-tailed snake's tail comprises less than 10 percent of the snake's total length, hence the common name. Named by A. Erwin Brown in 1890, Stilosoma extenuatum derives its generic name from the Greek stylos for pillar and soma for body. This refers to the stiffness of the short-tailed snake's body, which is caused by its wide and inflexible column of unusually short vertebrae. The specific name, extenuatum, is Latin for thin or slender.

Description
It is gray above with 50 to 80 dark blotches and may or may not have a yellow stripe running down the spine. The underside is white with dark brown blotches. It bears a more-than-superficial resemblance to other kingsnakes, especially the mole kingsnake (Lampropeltis calligaster rhombomaculata), but can be distinguished by its smaller size and much more slender build. Also, Lampropeltis extenuatum has six upper labials, whereas kingsnakes (genus Lampropeltis) have seven upper labials.

Behavior

The short-tailed snake is as poorly understood as it is seldom-seen, rare and geographically limited. It is a burrowing snake that rarely appears above ground and does so even more rarely during the day. Like other snakes of the tribe Lampropeltini, it vibrates its tail when startled by predators or people but can be distinguished from a rattlesnake by its slender build and lack of a rattle. An excitable snake, it makes a poor captive and is protected against harassment or captivity by Florida law. Despite this, much of what little we know about the short-tailed snake has been based on observations of captive specimens.

Diet
Captive specimens show a keen preference for black-crowned snakes of the genus Tantilla and will often eat them exclusively, rejecting other species of small snake or lizard. It is possible that black-crowned snakes, some of which are themselves small, burrowing snakes endemic to Florida, comprise the entire diet of wild short-tailed snakes.

Habitat and range

Found only in a handful of counties in central Florida, the short-tailed snake prefers sandy-soiled pine or oak woodlands, but may be found in other habitats, provided it has access to prey and suitable soil for burrowing.

Evolution and taxonomy
As a member of the tribe Lampropeltini, L. extenuata is ultimately derived from Old World rat snakes that crossed the Bering Land Bridge into North America more than 20 million years ago.  More recently, L. extenuata is a relict of the Miocene "Florida Island", separated from the mainland by higher sea levels. It is closely related to the kingsnakes and still bears a resemblance to the mole kingsnakes which are also found in Florida. One fossil species, Stilosoma vetustum, dates from the late Miocene, some 5-10 million years ago.  How far divergent L. extenuata is from its kingsnake ancestors is still a matter of debate. In 2009 Pyron and Burbrink resolved to include it in the kingsnake genus Lampropeltis based on multiple lines of molecular and morphological evidence obtained in theirs and earlier studies.

References

Further reading
Brown, A.E. 1890. On a new genus of Colubridæ from Florida. Proc. Acad. Nat. Sci. Philadelphia 42: 199-200. ("Stilosoma genus nov." and "Stilosoma extenuata, species nov." )
Carr, A.F., Jr. 1934. Notes on the Habits of the Short-Tailed Snake, Stilosoma extenuatum Brown. Copeia 1934 (3): 138–139.

External links
 Fossil snakes of North America: origin, evolution, distribution, paleoecology
 http://reptile-database.reptarium.cz/species.php?genus=Lampropeltis&species=extenuatum

Colubrids
Reptiles described in 1890